Felix Okot Ogong (born January 22, 1965) is a Ugandan economist, politician and member of parliament from Dokolo South County currently sitting in the Pan African Parliament, the legislative arm of African Union for a second term having been sent to the parliament during the 10th Ugandan Parliament. He was a State Minister for Youth and Children Affairs and he is a member of National Resistance Movement (NRM) on whose platform he served in the parliament since 1996. Ogong is the founder and Managing Director of Feslistar bus services and Voice of Lango Fm based in Lira town.

Life and education 
Ogong is a Christian and a member of Anglican denomination.  He earned a bachelor’s degree in Economics and Geography from Makerere University.

References 

Living people
1965 births
National Resistance Movement politicians
Members of the Parliament of Uganda
Makerere University alumni